Dickerson Township is an inactive township in Lewis County, in the U.S. state of Missouri.

Dickerson Township was established in 1833,  and named after Obadiah Dickerson, a pioneer citizen.

References

Townships in Missouri
Townships in Lewis County, Missouri